Qias Kandi (also Romanized as Qīās Kandī) is a village in Zarrineh Rud Rural District, Bizineh Rud District, Khodabandeh County, Zanjan Province, Iran. At the 2006 census, its population was 418, in 78 families.

References 

Populated places in Khodabandeh County